Helichus basalis is a species of long-toed water beetle in the family Dryopidae. It is found in North America.

References

Further reading

 

Dryopidae
Articles created by Qbugbot
Beetles described in 1852